The 2017–18 FC Schalke 04 season was the 114th season in the football club's history and 27th consecutive and 50th overall season in the top flight of German football, the Bundesliga, having been promoted from the 2. Bundesliga in 1991. In addition to the domestic league, Schalke 04 are also participating in this season's edition of the domestic cup, the DFB-Pokal. This is the 17th season for Schalke in the Veltins-Arena, located in Gelsenkirchen, North Rhine-Westphalia. The season covers a period from 1 July 2017 to 30 June 2018.

The season was the first since 2006-07 without Benedikt Höwedes, who departed to Juventus on a loan.

Players

Squad information

Transfers

In

Out

Club

Kit
Supplier: Adidas / Sponsor: Gazprom

Friendly matches

Competitions

Overview

Bundesliga

League table

Results summary

Results by round

Matches

DFB-Pokal

Statistics

Appearances and goals

Players in white left the club during the season.

Goalscorers

Clean sheets

Disciplinary record

References

FC Schalke 04 seasons
Schalke 04, FC